FC Ploieşti was a football club based in Ploieşti, Romania. It was founded in 1922 and dissolved in 1949.

History

In 1922, in Ploieşti, Tricolor club was formed, some of the founding members being: Gheorghiu, Jan Vasopol, Elly Roman the composer (the  first president) and N. Stambolgiu.

Until 1932, when the divisionary system is inaugurated, it activates in the district championship. Team used in this period: Botez – Lang, Gh. Dragomirescu – Anastasescu, M. Popescu, Şerbănescu – Stavrescu, Antonescu, Lae Dumitrescu, Frunzulescu, T. Ionescu. In 1927–28, plays against Olympia Bucharest the South League Final, and lost 1–2. Two years later, the club becomes the champions of the South League, winning against Victoria, at Constanţa, with 1–0.

In 1932 it wins the Ploieşti districtual championship and gets the right to play in the first season of the newly formed Divizia A (1932–33). Team used: Cristescu – Dunăreanu (A. Dragomirescu II), Gh. Dragomirescu I – Anastasescu, Schwarts, Grün – M. Dumitrescu, Oane Stănescu (Gohn), Spirea, Ştefănescu, M. Rădulescu. After two seasons played in the first division it relegates.

In 1936, Tricolor merges with CFPV (Căile Ferate Ploieşti-Văleni). The new club is named Tricolor CFPV and in charge of it we see: ing. V. Haret, ing. Gh. Coconea, Nelu Teodorescu and Nicu Stambolgiu. After 4 years in the Second Division, in 1938, Tricolor succeeds to promote, but only plays for one season, because it relegates again. But the following season it promotes, this time under a new name FC Ploieşti. It finishes the 1940–1941 of the First Division on an honorable position, 10th. Players used in the interwar period: Schrameck, Iordăchescu, Neagu, Dunăreanu, Lupaş, Pop, Miscoltz, Lakatos, Sperlea, Dobra, Marienuţ, Mosko, Kovács I, Kovács II, Bocşa, Kocsis, Galis, Maliţa, Antonescu, Bărbulescu, Bartunek.

After the war FC Ploieşti plays in the districtual championship, and in the 1946–47 season in the Second Division when it succeeds to promote for the third time in history in the First League. Team used: Ivan – Belesnay, Neagu (Kocsis) – Comănescu, Morava, Aştilean – Bădin, Antonescu, Georgescu, Maliţa, Palfi. The experience is brief, they relegate and the club disappears.

Honours

Liga I:
Winners (0):, Best Finnish: 5th 1932–33

Liga II:
Winners (3): 1937–38, 1939–40

Association football clubs established in 1922
Association football clubs disestablished in 1949
Defunct football clubs in Romania
Football clubs in Prahova County
Liga I clubs
Liga II clubs
Sport in Ploiești
1922 establishments in Romania
1949 disestablishments in Romania